Peter Sauer (February 2, 1900 – September 11, 1949), was an American professional wrestler, better known by the ring name Ray Steele. He was born and raised in Norka, a German colony in Russia, in 1900 before immigrating to Lincoln, Nebraska in 1906. A highly skilled and dangerous catch wrestler, Steele was known for his extensive knowledge of submission holds.

After a successful amateur wrestling career, Steele then started wrestling in the carnivals, where he honed his catch wrestling skills. Upon turning pro, he relocated to California and became a regular workout partner of fellow catch wrestler Ad Santel. On 16 May 1934, he wrestled Orville Brown to a 30-minute draw. He gained some notoriety in 1936 when he faced heavyweight boxing contender Kingfish Levinsky in what is considered an early mixed martial arts (MMA) contest, which Steele won in 35 seconds. Steele's biggest accomplishment in the sport was winning the National Wrestling Association's World Heavyweight Championship from Bronko Nagurski in St. Louis, Missouri on March 7, 1940. Steele would hold the belt for over a year before losing it back to Bronko Nagurski on March 11, 1941 in Houston, Texas.

Sauer served as a mentor and coach to many young stars, including Lou Thesz before his death of a heart attack in September 1949. Thesz considered Sauer to be one of the finest wrestlers he ever knew.

Championships and accomplishments
George Tragos/Lou Thesz Professional Wrestling Hall of Fame
Class of 2002
National Wrestling Association
World Heavyweight Championship (1 time)
Midwest Wrestling Association (Ohio)
MWA World Heavyweight Championship (Ohio version) (1 time)
Professional Wrestling Hall of Fame
Pioneer Era (Class of 2008)Wrestling Observer Newsletter''
Wrestling Observer Newsletter Hall of Fame (Class of 1996)

See also
 List of premature professional wrestling deaths

References

External links
 Profile at WrestlingMuseum.org
 Profile at VolgaGermans.net
 

1900 births
1949 deaths
Russian people of German descent
American people of Russian descent
20th-century American male actors
American male professional wrestlers
Professional Wrestling Hall of Fame and Museum
Russian male professional wrestlers
20th-century professional wrestlers
NWA World Junior Heavyweight Champions